Expedition Robinson 1998, was the second edition of Expedition Robinson, or Survivor as it is referred to in some countries, to air in Sweden and it aired in 1998. A major twist this season was that when a tribe lost an immunity challenge, the other tribe would vote out one of their members. Another twist was that of the 'joker', Jochen Schützdeller, who entered the game when the tribes merged. Along with the twists, this season was the first to include an alliance (The Girl Mafia), which would later go on to be a constant factor in later seasons. In the end, it was Alexandra Zazzi who won the season with a 7-2 jury vote over Birgitta Åberg. This season was much more successful than the premiere season, garnering over two million viewers per episode in later parts of the season.

Finishing order

The game

In the case of multiple tribes or castaways who win reward or immunity, they are listed in order of finish, or alphabetically where it was a team effort; where one castaway won and invited others, the invitees are in brackets.

 In the first episode there were two reward challenges played. The first challenge was for choice of beach location while the second was for comfort items and snacks.

Voting history

 As part of the twist this season, the tribe that won immunity voted someone out of the losing tribe.
 At the sixth tribal council, both Elizabeth and Susanne received five votes each. In order to determine who would be eliminated they were forced to draw lots.

References
Footnotes

Sources

External links
Expedition: Robinson i SVT 1997-2003
http://wwwc.aftonbladet.se/noje/robin/robinson.html
https://web.archive.org/web/20000609223040/http://www.svt.se/arkiv/robinson98/index.html

 1998
1998 Swedish television seasons